Janików may refer to the following places in Poland:
Janików, Lower Silesian Voivodeship (south-west Poland)
Janików, Świętokrzyskie Voivodeship (south-central Poland)
Janików, Kozienice County in Masovian Voivodeship (east-central Poland)
Janików, Przysucha County in Masovian Voivodeship (east-central Poland)
Janików, Greater Poland Voivodeship (west-central Poland)
Janików, Lubusz Voivodeship (west Poland)